Alessandro Moro (born 2 October 1984) is an Italian footballer who plays as a  defensive midfielder.

Career
Moro started his career at Udinese, which he was sold to Foggia in a co-ownership deal. In June 2004 he was signed by Foggia outright in June 2004. He joined Treviso in 2006 in another co-ownership deal, for a peppercorn of €500, after Udinese signed Moro from Ascoli for free, as a free agent. In June 2009 Treviso signed Moro outright. When Treviso were declared bankrupt in August 2009, Moro was signed by side Gallipoli along with team-mate William Pianu. For 2010–11 he was signed by 1° Divisione side A.S. Andria BAT.

References

External links
 aic.football.it 
 
 

1984 births
Living people
People from Latisana
Italian footballers
Udinese Calcio players
Calcio Foggia 1920 players
Ascoli Calcio 1898 F.C. players
Treviso F.B.C. 1993 players
F.C. Grosseto S.S.D. players
A.S.D. Gallipoli Football 1909 players
Serie A players
Serie B players
Serie C players
Association football midfielders
Italy youth international footballers
Footballers from Friuli Venezia Giulia